Alexander Addison may refer to:

 Alexander Addison (cricketer) (1877–1935), Australian cricketer
 Alexander Addison (judge) (1758–1807), American judge in Pennsylvania